Dale Sanderson (born December 12, 1961) is a former professional Canadian football offensive lineman who played 13 seasons for the Hamilton Tiger-Cats. He played college football at the University of Tennessee.

References

External links
Career statistics at Pro Football Archives
Tennessee Volunteers bio

1961 births
Living people
Canadian football offensive linemen
Hamilton Tiger-Cats players
Players of Canadian football from Ontario
Tennessee Volunteers football players